Laura Smulders (born 9 December 1993) is a Dutch racing cyclist who represents the Netherlands in BMX. She competed at the 2012 Summer Olympics in the women's BMX event where she won the bronze medal.

Personal
Her younger sister, Merel Smulders is also a BMX rider and became junior World Time Trial Champion at the 2016 UCI BMX World Championships.

See also
 List of Dutch Olympic cyclists

References

External links
 
 
 
 
 

1993 births
Living people
BMX riders
Dutch female cyclists
Olympic cyclists of the Netherlands
Olympic bronze medalists for the Netherlands
Olympic medalists in cycling
Cyclists at the 2012 Summer Olympics
Cyclists at the 2016 Summer Olympics
Cyclists at the 2020 Summer Olympics
Medalists at the 2012 Summer Olympics
European Games competitors for the Netherlands
Cyclists at the 2015 European Games
UCI BMX World Champions (elite women)
Sportspeople from Nijmegen
Cyclists from Gelderland
21st-century Dutch women